No. 4 may refer to:

 The number 4
No. 4, a 1966 experimental film directed by Yoko Ono
 No. 4 (album), by the rock band Stone Temple Pilots
No. 4 Commando, Commando regiment in the UK Army
No. 4 Squadron RAAF, Royal Australian Air Force squadron 
No. 4 Squadron RAF, Royal Air Force squadron
 String Quartet No. 4 (disambiguation), the title of compositions by multiple composers
 Symphony No. 4 (disambiguation), the title of compositions by multiple composers